Darreh Howz (also Romanized as Darreh Ḩowẕ; also known as ‘Abdolābād) is a village in Karchambu-e Jonubi Rural District, in the Central District of Buin va Miandasht County, Isfahan Province, Iran. At the 2006 census, its population was 194, in 39 families.

References 

Populated places in Buin va Miandasht County